John B. Orr Jr. ( – July 25, 1974) was an American attorney and politician who served as a member of the Florida House of Representatives and as the mayor of Miami-Dade County, Florida from 1972 to 1974.

Background 
Orr earned a Bachelor of Laws from the Fredric G. Levin College of Law at the University of Florida. In 1954, he was elected to the Florida House of Representatives. During his tenure in the House, Orr was the only member who voted against school segregation in 1956. He was defeated for re-election in 1958.

Orr was a mentor to Janet Reno during her early career in Miami-Dade County politics.

In 1972, Orr was elected the third mayor of Miami-Dade County, Florida. Orr died of cancer in 1974 and was succeeded by Stephen P. Clark. Orr is the namesake of the Jack Orr Plaza Apartments, a public housing complex.

References 

1920s births
1974 deaths
Mayors of Miami-Dade County, Florida
Democratic Party members of the Florida House of Representatives
People from Miami
People from Miami-Dade County, Florida
Fredric G. Levin College of Law alumni
University of Florida alumni
20th-century American politicians